Gastão Elias won the title, defeating Boris Pašanski 6–3, 7–5 in the final.

Seeds

Draw

Finals

Top half

Bottom half

References
 Main Draw
 Qualifying Draw

Peugeot Tennis Cup - Singles
2012 Singles